Eggingen is a municipality in the district of Waldshut in Baden-Württemberg in Germany. There is an international border crossing to the village of Wunderklingen in the neighbouring canton of Schaffhausen in Switzerland.

References

Waldshut (district)
Baden
Germany–Switzerland border crossings